Each winner of the 1972 Governor General's Awards for Literary Merit was selected by a panel of judges administered by the Canada Council for the Arts.

English Language
Fiction: Robertson Davies, The Manticore
Poetry or Drama: Dennis Lee, Civil Elegies and Other Poems
Poetry or Drama: John Newlove, Lies

French Language
Fiction: Antonine Maillet, 
Poetry or Drama: Gilles Hénault, 
Non-Fiction: Jean Hamelin and Yves Roby, 

Governor General's Awards
Governor Generals Awards, 1972
1972 literary awards